Vientiane province is a province of Laos in the country's northwest. As of 2015 the province had a population of 419,090. Vientiane province covers an area of  composed of 11 districts. The principal towns are Vang Vieng and Muang Phôn-Hông.

In the mid-16th century, Vientiane, under King Setthathirat's rule, became prosperous. It became a major centre of Buddhist teachings and many temples were built.
In 1989, the province was split into two halves: Vientiane prefecture containing the city Vientiane itself, and the remainder of the province.

History
The Laotian epic, the Phra Lak Phra Lam, claims that Prince Thattaradtha founded the city when he left the legendary Lao kingdom of Muong Inthapatha Maha Nakhone because he was denied the throne in favor of his younger brother. Thattaradtha founded a city called Maha Thani Si Phan Phao on the west bank of the Mekong River; this city was said to have later become today's Udon Thani, Thailand. One day, a seven-headed Naga told Thattaradtha to start a new city on the east bank of the river opposite Maha Thani Si Phan Phao.  The prince called this city Chanthabuly Si Sattanakhanahud, which was said to be the predecessor of modern Vientiane.

Contrary to the Phra Lak Phra Ram, most historians believe that the city of Vientiane was an early Khmer settlement centered around a Hindu temple, which the Pha That Luang would later replace. Khmer princes ruling Say Fong were known to have made pilgrimages to the shrine near Vientiane.  In the 11th and 12th centuries, the time when the Lao and Thai people are believed to have entered Southeast Asia from Southern China, the few remaining Khmer in the area were either killed, removed, or assimilated into the Lao civilization, which would soon populate the area.

In 1354, when Fa Ngum founded the kingdom of Lan Xang, Vientiane became an important administrative city, even though it was not made the capital. King Setthathirath established it as the capital of Lan Xang in 1563, to avoid a Burmese invasion. For the following several centuries Vientiane's position was unstable: at times it was strong and a regional centre, but many times it came under the control of Vietnam, Burma, or Siam.

When Lan Xang fell apart in 1707, it became an independent Kingdom of Vientiane. In 1779, it was conquered by the Siamese general Phraya Chakri and made a vassal of Siam. When King Anouvong tried to establish an independent kingdom, and led an unsuccessful rebellion, it was obliterated by Siamese armies in 1827. The city was burned to the ground and was looted of nearly all Lao artifacts, including Buddha statues and people. The Siamese routed Anouvong and razed the city leaving only the Wat Si Saket in good shape, shifting all people. Vientiane was in great disrepair, depopulated, and disappearing into the forest, when the French arrived in 1867. It eventually passed to French rule in 1893. It became the capital of the French protectorate of Laos in 1899. The French rebuilt the city and rebuilt or repaired Buddhist temples such as Pha That Luang, Haw Phra Kaew, and left many colonial buildings behind. By a decree signed in 1900 by Governor-General Paul Doumer, the province was divided into four muang: Borikan, Patchoum, Tourakom, and Vientiane. Two years earlier, men from these four muang were responsible for building a house for the first administrator of Vientiane, Pierre Morin.

During World War II, Vientiane fell with little resistance and was occupied by Japanese forces, under the command of Sako Masanori. On 9 March 1945 French paratroopers arrived, and "liberated" Vientiane on 24 April 1945.

As the Laotian Civil War broke out between the Royal Lao Government and the Pathet Lao, Vientiane became unstable. In August 1960, Kong Le seized the capital and insisted that Souvanna Phouma, become prime minister. In mid-December, General Phoumi then seized the capital, overthrew the Phouma Government, and installed Boun Oum as prime minister. In mid-1975, Pathet Lao troops moved towards the city and US personnel began evacuating the capital. On 23 August 1975, a contingent of 50 Pathet Lao women, symbolically "liberated" the city. On 2 December 1975, the communist party of the Pathet Lao took over Vientiane and defeated the Kingdom of Laos which ended the Laotian Civil War, but the ongoing Insurgency in Laos began in the jungle, with the Pathet Lao fighting the Hmongs and royalists in-exile.

In the 1950s and 1960s during the French-Indo China War and Vietnam War, thousands of refugees arrived in the province. By 1963, some 128,000 at arrived, especially Hmong people from Xiengkhouang province. Some 150,000 more arrived in the early-1970s. Many of the refugees arrived were addicted to opium. In 1989, the province was split into two parts, Vientiane prefecture, which contains the capital, Vientiane, and the remaining area, Vientiane province.

In late-2006, 13 ethnic Khmu Christians were arrested in the village of Khon Kean. One was released in April 2007, and on 16 May, nine others were released after being held at a police facility in Hin Heup.

The Xaysomboun region experiences sporadic violence between government forces and Hmong rebels.

Geography
The province borders Luang Prabang province to the north, Xiangkhouang province to the northeast, Bolikhamxai province to the east, Vientiane prefecture and Thailand to the south, and Xaignabouli province to the west. The principal towns are Vang Vieng and Muang Phôn-Hông. Most of the population of the province lives in the towns and villages along and near Route 13. From the south to the north these include Ban Phonsoung, Ban Saka and Toulakhom (along Route 10 east of Route 13), Ban Nalao, Ban Nong Khay, Ban Keng Kang, Ban Vang Khay, Ban Houay Pamon, Ban Namone, Vang Vieng, Ban Nampo, Ban Phatang, Ban Bome Phek, Ban Thieng, Muang Kasi and Ban Nam San Noi near the border with Xiangkhouang province.

Several kilometres to the south of Vang Vieng is one of Laos's largest lakes, Nam Ngum. Much of this area, particularly the forests of the southern part, are under the Phou Khao Khouay National Bio-Diversity Conservation Area. To the east is the highest peak of Laos, Phou Bia, a heavily forested hilly area, east of Ban Thamkalong. The principal rivers flowing through the province are the Nam Song River, Nam Ngum River and the Nam Lik River.

Protected areas
It was established on 29 October 1993 covering an area of 2,000 km2 extending into Khet Phiset Xaisomboon (special zone), Vientiane prefecture, and Vientiane province. Its mountainous topography, with elevation varying from 200 m to 1761 m, emerged from "uplifting and exposure of the underlying sedimentary (Indosinias schist-clay-sandstone) complex". Sandstone is also seen spread in layers. extensive flat uplands with sandstones with hardly any soil cover are also part of the topography of the park. It has a large stretch of mountain range  with sandstone cliffs, river gorges and three large rivers with tributaries which flow into the Mekong River. It has monsoonal climate with recorded annual rainfall of 1936 mm (with higher reaches recording more rainfall). The mean annual temperature is 26.6 °C with a mean maximum of 31.6 °C and a mean minimum temperature of 21.5 °C. The forests are evergreen, Shorea mixed deciduous forest, dry dipterocarp and pine type; particularly coniferous forest, of mono specific stands of Pinus merkusii, Fokienia hodgsonsii, bamboo (mai sanod), and fire-climax grasslands. Animals found here include elephants, tigers, bears, white-cheeked gibbons, and langurs and many species of reptiles, amphibians, and birds. The green peafowl has been reported here, near Ban Nakhay and Ban Nakhan Thoung, although it was generally considered to be extinct in Laos; conservation management has increased its population.

Ban Na Reserve is a wildlife protected area where trekking is popular in its peripheral areas. The habitat is known for its bamboo, dense forest and wild elephants.

The Mekong channel upstream of Vientiane Important Bird Area (IBA) is 18,230 hectares in size. As its name implies it comprises an approximately  section of the Mekong upstream of Vientiane. It spreads over two provinces: Vientiane and Sainyabuli. The topography features braided streams, bushland, gravel bars, open sandy islands, rock outcrops, and sand bars. Notable avifauna include great thick-knees (Esacus recurvirostris), Jerdon's bushchat (Saxicola jerdoni), river lapwing (Vanellus duvaucelii), small pratincole (Glareola lactea), and wire-tailed swallow (Hirundo smithii). Around the village of Ban Sivilay, a bird sanctuary has large flocks of whistling ducks and egrets roosting.

Administrative divisions
The province is composed of 11 districts:

Demographics
Population figures for the province increased dramatically during the period between 1943 (23,200) to 1955 (45,000). The demographics for ethnic breakdown in 1943 were: Lao 41.5%; Vietnamese (Annamites) 53%; Chinese 4%; Others 1.5%. The population last reported was 419,090, as of the 2015 census with Muang Phôn-Hông as its capital.

Economy
Since 2000, tourism in the region has rocketed, with many thousands visiting Vientiane and Vang Vieng every year. In recent years, new investment has gone into the suburbs of Vientiane. A tile factory has been established in the village of Phai Lom and a bio-organic fertilizer factory has been established in the village of Dong Xiengdy. Another tile factory has also been established in the village of Hathdeua, Keo Oudom District.  Lonely Planet said of the impact of tourism upon the town of Vang Vieng, "The growth of Vang Vieng has taken its toll. Inevitably the profile of the town has changed and the reason travelers first came here- to experience small-town Laos in a stunning setting – has been replaced by multistorey guesthouses. Even the local market has moved to a big, soulless slab of concrete north of the town. In the “Ban Bo village of Thoulakhom District salt extraction is popular part time economic activity. The village is 60 kilometers from Vientiane and the extraction of salt is done by traditional methods.

Although tourism has grown rapidly, most rural peoples still depend upon agriculture for their livelihoods. The Vientiane Plain which covers Vientiane province and Vientiane Municipality is one of the six major rice producing plains in Laos. Crafts and tailoring also employs a significant number, and most rural villages in the province have tailors who make pants, shirts, mosquito nets and sheets. Herb doctors and carpenters are also occupations for a select few in the villages. In the village of Ban Bo in Thoulakhom District is a salt extraction plant, employing most of the inhabitants in traditional extraction methods.

Major operating companies in the mineral sector, as of 2008, include: Padeang Industry Public Co. Ltd, Phu Bin Ming Ltd, Laos Cement Co. Ltd, Wanrong Cement I, and Barite Mining Co. As of 2009, each of the 126 ministry offices in Vientiane had IT facilities, including "one server, 10 PCs, a teleconference room, and a local area network connected to the national e-government infrastructure."

Landmarks
There are numerous caves in the province, especially in the Vang Vieng area. Of note are the Patang, Patho Nokham, Vangxang and Tham Chang Caves. Vangxang Cave, also known as Elephant Court, contains the remains of an ancient sanctuary which preexisted the Lane Xang Kingdom, and contains five pink sandstone sculptures and two great Buddha images. Vang Vieng contains several Buddhist temples dated to the 16th and 17th centuries; among them Wat Si Vieng Song (Wat That), Wat Kang and Wat Si Sum are of note. Ecotourism is a significant contributor to the provincial economy, and Adventure Lao manages a kayaking operation on the Nam Song River, Nam Ngum River and the Nam Lik River, which enables tourists to pass many villages. There is an artificial lake near the village of Ban Sivilay village with a protected bird habitat. Also of note is Ban Ilai market in Muang Naxaithong, which sells basketry, pottery and other traditional crafts.

Famous water falls seen in Phu Khao Khuay are Tat Xai (which has seven cascades), further downstream the Pha Xai (40 m fall) and Tat Luek.

Wat Pha Bhat Phonson at Tha Pha Baht is a rocky formation where Buddha foot prints, reclining Buddha and a monastery with large ornamented stupa (built in 1933) are worshipped.

Ban Pako village in the midst of thick forests, 55 km away from Vientiane has eco-lodges created over a 40 ha forest preserve, which is a tourist attraction. The houses in this village are made of bamboo thatch at an isolated location stated to have been a settlement 2000 years ago which has been attested by archaeological finds of artifacts. A wat and a water fall are also located here.

The Nam Ngum Reservoir on the Nam Ngum River, within in the Nam Ngum Reserve is an important water resources project which extends over a water spread area of 1,280 hectares  during the monsoon season. The lake provides for recreational activities such as boating and picnics.

Among the many caves in the province, the Vangxang Cave also called the "Elephant Court" remnants of an ancient sanctuary of the Lane Xang Kingdom are seen. It is approachable along Route 13 (north) located at km 48, the cave has 5 large sculptures made of pink sandstone and also two massive images of Buddha.

The Thoulakhom Zoo houses exotic and rare animals of Laos.

References

Sources

External links

 
Provinces of Laos